This is a list of on-air personalities from the professional wrestling television series WWE's SmackDown. On-air personalities include the wrestlers themselves, ring announcers, commentators, and on-screen authority figures. The show also features recurring on-air segments hosted by various personalities.

Authority figures 

{|class="sortable wikitable" style="font-size: 85%;"
|-
!Authority figures || Position || Date started || Date finished || Notes
|-
|Mr. McMahon
|Owner, chairman, and CEO
|
|
|McMahon assigned new General Managers to Raw and to SmackDown after Ric Flair lost his position on Raw. Stacy Keibler served as "Personal Assistant" through McMahon's term.
|-
|Shawn Michaels
|Commissioner
|
|
|Relinquished role to Mick Foley
|-
|Mick Foley
|Commissioner
|
|
|Fired by Mr. McMahon
|-
|Debra
|Lt. Commissioner
|
|
|Resigned as Lieutenant Commissioner to pursue managing again.
|-
|William Regal
|Commissioner
|
|
|Fired by Linda McMahon for joining The Alliance
|-
|Mick Foley
|Commissioner
|
|
|Decided to leave the company
|-
|Ric Flair
|On-screen co-owner of the company
|
|
|Upon the beginning of the brand extension, McMahon was given sole control of SmackDown, while Flair was given control of Raw. Between November 2001 and the brand extension, Flair had as much power over all shows as McMahon.
|-
|Stephanie McMahon
|General manager
|
|
|Lost her position as per an "I Quit" match stipulation against Mr. McMahon at No Mercy.
|-
|Paul Heyman
|General manager
|
|
|Resigned after being drafted to Raw, he didn't want to work for Eric Bischoff and quit WWE, he was Interim General Manager on the April 22, 2004 edition of WWE SmackDown.
|-
|Kurt Angle
|General manager
|
|
|Returned to the active roster when no longer confined to a wheelchair.
|-
|Theodore Long
|General manager
|
|
|Left position due to health complications. Served as "Assistant General Manager" from November 2007 to May 2008.Long was reassigned from ECW to SmackDown. Lost the position to John Laurinaitis as a result of the Team Johnny vs. Team Teddy match at Wrestlemania XXVIII.
|-
|Vickie Guerrero
|General manager
|July 19, 2013
|June 23, 2014
|Served as assistant general manager from May to September 2007. Opted to fully take over the position on Raw and resigned as general manager of SmackDown. Took over in place of the injured Teddy Long. Announced new general manager of SmackDown on July 19, 2013 by Mr. McMahon; lost position on June 23, 2014 edition of Raw in a match against Stephanie McMahon.
|-
|Big Show
|Temporary General Manager
|colspan="2" style="text-align:center;" | 
|Big Show filled in for Vickie Guerrero while she recovered from being tombstoned by The Undertaker.
|-
|Triple H
|Chief Operating Officer (Storyline)
|
|
|The Board of Directors removed Vince McMahon from day to day power and handed the duties to his son-in-law. However, his authoritative control powers as general manager of running SmackDown are no longer needed and still remained as COO (see below).Lost position in November 2014 after The Authority lost at Survivor Series.Triple H also served as Executive Vice-president of Talent, Live Events and Creative.
|-
|John Laurinaitis
|General manager
|
|
|Won position, Team Johnny vs Team Teddy at Wrestlemania XXVIII. Fired at No Way Out by Mr. McMahon as per pre-match stipulation when John Cena defeated Big Show in a Steel cage match.
|-
|Interim General Managers
|Guest GM
|
|
|Following Laurinaitis' firing, the Board of Directors invited past GMs and Commissioners to run SmackDown on a weekly basis until a new full-time GM was named, such as Mick Foley, Vickie Guerrero and Zack Ryder.
|-
|Booker T
|General manager
|
|July 12, 2013
|Mr. McMahon announced Booker T as the new general manager of SmackDown.
|-
|Theodore Long
|Senior Advisor
|
|July 12, 2013
|Was named Booker's advisor after he asked for his help. Served as general manager during Booker's injury.
|-
|Eve Torres
|Assistant to general manager
|
|
|Won the position in a match against Kaitlyn. Left position after she quit WWE.
|-
|Kane
|Director of operations
|
|
|Lost position after The Authority lost at Survivor Series.
|-
|Triple H
|Chief Operating Officer (Storyline)
|
|2019
|Stephanie McMahon announced that Triple H would return to the WWE as the COO.
|-
|Shane McMahon 
|Commissioner
|
|
|Lost a Loser Leaves WWE Ladder match to Kevin Owens.
|-
|Daniel Bryan
|General manager
|
|
|Shane assigned Bryan as his general manager.
|-
|Paige
|General manager
|
|
|Shane assigned Paige as general manager after Bryan resigned from the position to return to in-ring action.After the announcement on the December 17, 2018 edition of Raw that the McMahons (Vince, Stephanie, Shane, and Triple H) were, as a united group, taking over both Raw and SmackDown, Paige was effectively removed as general manager.
|-
|Sonya Deville
|WWE Official
|
|
|Began appearing as the assistant to on-screen authority figure Adam Pearce on the January 1, 2021 edition of SmackDown, later appearing on the Raw brand in the same role. Deville eventually began making questionable and blatantly self-serving decisions which led to Pearce terminating her contract as a WWE Official on the May 9, 2022 edition of Raw.
|-
|Adam Pearce
|WWE Official
||Present'|Since January 2020, Pearce has been the main on-screen WWE Authority Figure for Raw and Smackdown, making the vast majority of the matches and presiding over issues needing resolution from management.
|}

 Commentators 

 Filled in for Jerry Lawler, who was absent at the time.
 Filled in for Tazz, who was absent at the time.
 Cole and Booker was absent at the time during WrestleMania week, so both men were replaced by Striker to call the event.
 Mathews was absent at the time after being attacked by Brock Lesnar on the April 23, 2012 episode of Raw, so only Cole and Booker called the event.
 Booker was absent at the time, so only Mathews and Cole called the event.
 Following the absence of Josh Mathews, Michael Cole was joined by various guest commentators for one night on SmackDown. The following is a list of the guest commentators who joined Michael Cole on the August 24, 2012 episode of SmackDown:

 Cole and JBL was absent due to the live report from WrestleMania Axxess, so both men were replaced by Lawler to call the event.
 Filled in for JBL, who was absent at the time.
 JBL was absent at the time, so only Phillips and Cole called the event.
 Saxton was absent due to a live prediction about the upcoming matches at WrestleMania with Renee Young, so only two men called the event.
 Filled in for Michael Cole, who was recovering from injury after being attacked by Brock Lesnar on the March 30, 2015 episode of Raw.
 Filled in for Byron Saxton, who joined Raw as a color commentator since June 8, 2015.
 Replaced Booker T as announced on Raw on January 4, 2016.
 Ranallo was absent due to suffering from influenza and was filled in by Michael Cole from Monday Night Raw on February 18, 2016.
 Due to Lawler being suspended, he was filled in by David Otunga from Main Event and Superstars for two weeks.
 Michael Cole was representing Raw for the 2016 WWE draft.
 Announced as the new commentary team following the 2016 WWE Draft Lottery.
 When Ranallo was absent due to suffering from depression, Tom Phillips filled in for him as play-by-play.
 Saxton temporarily joined the commentary team following the 2017 WWE Superstar Shake-up.
 When Tom Phillips was on assignment, he was filled in by Raw'''s Michael Cole.
 Otunga filled in for Byron Saxton, who was absent at the time.
 On November 1, 2019, due to significant flight delays returning from the Crown Jewel event in Riyadh, Saudi Arabia, more than 100 WWE employees were not able to travel to Buffalo, New York in time to appear on Smackdown Live on Fox. In response, WWE featured multiple NXT superstars who did not travel to Saudi Arabia. McAfee was among them as guest color commentary, joining Renee Young and Tom Phillips, while replacing Aiden English.
 Filled in for Pat McAfee, who was recovering from COVID-19.
 Pat McAfee is currently taking a temporary hiatus from SmackDown, due to providing coverage for College GameDay.

Ring announcers

Recurring segments

See also 
 List of WWE Raw on-air personalities
 List of current champions in WWE

References 

On-air personalities
SmackDown on-air personalities